PPD may refer to:

Computing
 Prearranged Payment and Deposit; a payment format used in US inter-bank debit and credit transactions, part of the ACH Network specifications.
 Pixels per degree, a measure of the resolution of a display screen as seen from an angle
 Points per day, a mechanism for measuring work done in the Folding@home distributed computing project
 PostScript Printer Description, a file created by a printer vendor that describes the entire set of capabilities of a particular PostScript printer model
 Portable Programmer Device, Device used to program programmable ic

Police and security
 Personal protection detail, a security detail tasked with protecting one or more persons
 Philadelphia Police Department, a police agency in Pennsylvania, United States
 Phoenix Police Department, a police agency in Arizona, United States
 Presidential Protective Division, part of the United States Secret Service tasked with protecting the President and others
 Probation and Parole Division in New Mexico, United States

Political parties
 Social Democratic Party (Portugal) (Partido Social Democrata), originally named Popular Democratic Party or Democratic People's Party (Partido Popular Democrático), a political party in Portugal
 Partito Popolare Democratico Svizzero, a political party in Switzerland
 Party for Democracy (Chile) (Partido por la Democracia), a political party in Chile
 Popular Democratic Party (Puerto Rico) (Partido Popular Democrático), a political party in Puerto Rico

Science and medicine
 Paranoid personality disorder, a mental disorder characterized by paranoia and a pervasive, long-standing suspiciousness and generalized mistrust of others.
 p-Phenylenediamine, an aromatic amine
 Persistent Pigment Darkening, a measure of UVA protection of sunscreens
 Pharmaceutical Product Development, a global contract research organization (CRO)
 Pheophorbidase, an enzyme
 PPD test, Purified Protein Derivative test or Mantoux test, a screening test for tuberculosis
 Postpartum depression, a mental disorder affecting parents within the first year of their child's birth
 Pour point depressant, a chemical added to crude oil to lower its "pour point"
 ppd, Protopanaxadiol, a molecule
 Psychogenic polydipsia, excessive water intake with a psychiatric or pharmaceutical cause
 Postharvest physiological deterioration, natural change of crop tissues which is undesirable for human or livestock use

Other
 PPD, Inc., an American contract clinical trial company.
 Pani Poni Dash!, a Japanese manga series 
 Partners in Population and Development, an international intergovernmental organization for "southern" countries worldwide
 Pengangkutan Penumpang Djakarta, a bus operator in Jakarta, Indonesia
 Pontypridd railway station, Wales, its National Rail station code
 ppd, an American professional video game player
 PPD-40, a Russian submachine gun
 Prevention Project Dunkelfeld, an effort to help self-identifying pedophiles to stay offence free
 Published Price to Dealer, a music industry term designating unit price
 Presidential Policy Directive, a kind of national security directive from the Obama presidency